West Fallowfield is the name of two townships in Pennsylvania:

 West Fallowfield Township, Chester County, Pennsylvania
 West Fallowfield Township, Crawford County, Pennsylvania